Cool Paradise is a smooth jazz album by keyboardist and jazz vocalist Ben Sidran, released in 1990. It is Sidran's eighteenth album, and his first release with the Go Jazz label he started in 1989.

Track listing

Personnel

Musicians
ArrangementBilly Peterson
Lead vocalsBen Sidran
Background vocalsRicky Peterson
BassBilly Peterson
KeyboardsRicky Peterson, Ben Sidran
Tenor saxophoneBob Malach

Support
Recording and mixingSteve Wiese at Creation Audio, Minneapolis, MN
MasteringGeorge Marino at Sterling Sound, New York
Additional recordingJohn "Chopper" Black
Art directionToni Eckmayer, Zillman Advertising & Marketing
DesignPlanet Design Company, Madison, Wisconsin

Reception

Writing for AllMusic, Jim Newsom declared Cool Paradise to be Sidran's "most fully realized recording"; complimenting his working band, audio clarity, Sidran's "cool and relaxed" voice and his "compelling" compositions. He concludes "it's surprising that Sidran hasn't become better known in pop and contemporary jazz circles" for such material.

References

External links
Album on Amazon
Album on Apple iTunes
Album on CDUniverse
Album on MSN Music
Album on Paris Jazz Corner (English)
Album on Yahoo! Music

Ben Sidran albums
1990 albums